Sylvio Ronny Rodelin (born 18 November 1989) is a French professional footballer who plays as a forward for Swiss club Servette.

Club career

Early career
Rodelin began his youth and senior career at Rodez. During the 2007–08 season, he scored 1 goal in 23 Championnat National matches. In July 2008 he signed for Ligue 1 club Nantes. On 28 January 2010, Championnat National club Troyes signed him on loan from Nantes until the end of the 2009–10 season. He played the 2010–11 season in Ligue 2 with Nantes, making 19 appearances (15 of them in Ligue 2) and scoring 5 goals (all of them scored in Ligue 2) in all competitions.

Lille
On 13 June 2011, he signed a four-year contract to join Ligue 1 club Lille. On 6 August 2011, he made his competitive debut for Lille, coming on as a substitute for Florent Balmont in the 87th minute in the Ligue 1 away match against AS Nancy which ended in a 1–1 draw.

Mouscron-Péruwelz (loan)
On 2 February 2015, Rodelin was loaned to Belgian Pro League club Mouscron-Péruwelz.

Caen (loan)
On 31 August 2015, Rodelin joined Ligue 1 club Stade Malherbe Caen on a year-long loan, with Caen given an option to buy him. On 12 September 2015, he made his competitive debut for Caen, starting in the Ligue 1 away match against Troyes AC which Caen won 3–1. He played in all of Caen's remaining 33 (starting in 32 of them) Ligue 1 matches of the 2015–16 season. He was Caen's second-highest scorer (behind Andy Delort) during the 2015–16 season with 10 goals (all of them scored in Ligue 1) and 2 assists in all competitions.

Caen
On 26 July 2016, Caen activated the clause to permanently sign Rodelin; he signed a three-year contract with Caen. On 20 May 2017, the last matchday of the 2016–17 Ligue 1 season, Rodelin scored the goal (his 9th and final Ligue 1 goal of the 2016–17 season) that ensured Caen remained in Ligue 1 for the 2017–18 season. With Caen needing a win against 2016–17 Ligue 1 runners-up Paris Saint-Germain to be sure of avoiding relegation, Rodelin had a penalty saved in the second half when Caen was down 1–0 before eventually finding the equalizer a minute into added time; the final score was 1–1.

Guingamp
In August 2018, Rodelin joined league rivals En Avant de Guingamp.

Servette
On 6 July 2021, he moved to Servette in Switzerland on a two-year contract. He made his competitive debut on 25 July in a 2–1 league win away over FC Sion, coming on as a substitute for Kastriot Imeri in the 58th minute. His first goal came on 22 August, scoring the final goal of a 4–1 win over FC Luzern, less than 30 seconds after coming off the bench.

International career
Born in Réunion, Rodelin is of Malagasy descent and was approached to join the Madagascar national team in March 2018.

References

External links
 
 Footmercato

1989 births
Living people
French sportspeople of Malagasy descent
Association football forwards
Footballers from Réunion
French footballers
Rodez AF players
FC Nantes players
ES Troyes AC players
Lille OSC players
Royal Excel Mouscron players
Stade Malherbe Caen players
En Avant Guingamp players
Servette FC players
Ligue 1 players
Ligue 2 players
Belgian Pro League players
Swiss Super League players
French expatriate footballers
Expatriate footballers in Belgium
French expatriate sportspeople in Belgium
Expatriate footballers in Switzerland
French expatriate sportspeople in Switzerland